Every Little Crook and Nanny is a 1972 comedy film starring Victor Mature who came out of retirement to play the role. It was his first major film role since 1966. "They caught me when I felt like saying yeah," said Mature.

The title is a Spoonerism on the old phrase, "Every little nook and cranny."

Plot
Vito Garbugli and Mario Azzecca, the bumbling lawyers of mob boss Carmine Ganucci, evict Nanny Poole, a British etiquette teacher, in order to secure her studio as a bookie joint. They then struggle to find a nanny for Ganucci's son Lewis, who will be left alone while Ganucci and his wife Stella visit Naples, Italy. When Nanny bursts into the office to complain about her eviction, Ganucci, impressed with her accent, hires her despite her protests that she is not a child's nursemaid. Realizing Ganucci is a gangster despite Vito and Mario's insistence that "There's no such thing as the mafia," Nanny accepts the job, but plots with her pianist Luther to kidnap Lewis and demand a $50,000 ransom with which she can set up a new studio. In Naples, Ganucci tries to avoid work and tells Stella that Nanny will lend class to Lewis, whom he hopes will grow up with no connection to the mafia. Despite Ganucci's wishes, Lewis is at that moment pretending to be a mafia boss and groping Nanny, who handles him with aplomb. Luther, who believes Ganucci is a retired soft drink manufacturer, bumbles his way through a break-in and absconds with Lewis, who calmly stops to put on the watch his father gave him. Ganucci has told Nanny to call Benny Napkins, one of his flunkies, in case of trouble, so she now advises him of the "kidnapping." Benny, a cowardly young man, is easily convinced by Nanny to keep the matter quiet and try to raise the ransom money himself. Meanwhile, two con men in Italy persuade Ganucci to purchase some gold medallions for $50,000, and he wires Vito and Mario for the money. The lawyers deliberate endlessly over how to send the money, finally deciding to send Benny to Naples with a bundle of cash. Luther has brought Lewis to his home, where his wife Ida dotes on the boy and asks Luther to have children with her. He declines, referring to his tortured relationship with his father and the fact that he is a "genetic failure." Later, Nanny interrupts Benny as he is trying to make love to his girl friend, who refuses to stop watching TV. They return to Ganucci's house, where Stella calls to talk to Lewis. Nanny's composure while deflecting Stella's questions impresses Benny, who kisses her with passion. Desperate to raise the ransom, Benny robs a poker game, but when he wanders the town with his stocking mask still on, he is arrested and the money is confiscated. Nanny bails him out, bathes him and puts him to bed, where he asks her to retire with him to his cottage in the country. After they make love, Mario knocks on the door and gives Benny $50,000 to deliver to Naples. Nanny is thrilled but Benny points out that it is not their money. Meanwhile, the police, realizing that Benny works for Ganucci, return the confiscated money to Vito, who, believing it is the same $50,000 that Mario delivered to Benny, returns the money to Benny's house. Now holding two envelopes containing $50,000 each, Benny breaks down in confusion and tells Nanny he is just an organization man and cannot use Ganucci's money without his approval. Disappointed, she leaves. Taking matters into her own hands, Nanny tells Mario and Vito about the kidnapping, but as soon as they give her the ransom, they hear from Ganucci that he is returning from Italy, and confident that their boss can handle the matter himself, take the money back. At the same time, Dominick, a petty thief, breaks into Luther's house and steals Lewis' watch as the child sleeps. Benny is at his friend's bar when Dominick enters and tries to use the watch as barter. When Dominick reads aloud the inscription on the watch, Benny realizes Dominick robbed the house in which Lewis is being held, and demands that Dominick take him there. They go to Luther's apartment, where Luther has just learned that Lewis is indeed Ganucci's son, and, panicked, is planning to return him to his father. Ida, however, refuses to let Lewis go and escapes with him out the window just as Nanny shows up to bring the boy home. As Nanny and Luther leave to track down Ida, Benny breaks in but, finding the apartment empty, decides to send Dominick to Nanny with one of the $50,000 envelopes so she can pay the ransom. He then leaves for the airport to fly to Naples with the other envelope, while at that moment Nanny and Luther are racing to the airport to flee to London, and Ganucci is arriving at the airport from Italy. When Ganucci deplanes, he sees Benny and takes the money from him, having decided not to buy the medallions. Upon leaving, he then happens upon Nanny, who claims to have come to greet the Ganuccis. Luther, introduced as Lewis' new piano teacher, and Nanny drive home with the Ganuccis, trembling with fear that the couple will soon find their son missing. Unknown to them, however, Ida has returned Lewis to his home. Later that night, as Nanny puts Lewis to bed, the boy arrogantly informs her he knows she was behind the kidnapping and plans to tell his father. Nanny immediately calls in Ganucci, knowing he will consider Lewis' story a fabrication, and as she has planned, he counsels his son to be honest and "classy." Afterward, Nanny kisses Lewis and tells him he must become his own man and not try to emulate his tough father. Days later, Nanny fondly bids Lewis farewell, and with the $50,000 that Dominick has delivered, heads for Naples with Benny.

Cast

 Lynn Redgrave - Miss Poole 
 Victor Mature - Carmine Ganucci 
 Paul Sand - Benny Napkins 
 Maggie Blye - Stella Ganucci 
 John Astin - Vito Garbugli 
 Dom DeLuise - Mario Azzecca
 Austin Pendleton - Luther
 Louise Sorel - Marie
 Phillip Graves - Lewis Ganucci
 Lou Cutell - Landruncolo
 Leopoldo Trieste - Truffatore
 Pat Morita - Nonaka
 Phil Foster - Lt. Bozzaris
 Pat Harrington Jr. - Willie Shakespeare

See also
 List of American films of 1972

References

External links
 
 Every Little Crook and Nanny trailer at TCMDB

1972 films
1970s crime comedy films
American crime comedy films
1970s English-language films
Films about kidnapping
Films based on American novels
Films based on organized crime novels
Films scored by Fred Karlin
Mafia comedy films
Metro-Goldwyn-Mayer films
1972 comedy films
1970s American films
Films based on novels by Ed McBain